Robert Kuven (21 August 1901, Strasbourg – 25 April 1983, Strasbourg) was a German/French painter and watercolorist.

Biography
From childhood, Robert Kuven was fond of drawing, but his parents considered a career as an artist as risky. Initially he trained as an architect at the Ecole Nationale Technique d’Architecture de Strasbourg and then worked as an architect until 1926. He continued to draw and paint and made copies of great masters.

He then attended the School of Decorative Arts in Cologne and then from 1927 to 1930 studied in Munich. Soon he moved to Paris and attended the Académie Julian, then continued studies in Germany. He returned to Strasbourg in 1932 and taught drawing at the École supérieure des arts décoratifs de Strasbourg. Throughout this period he made several trips to other European countries. He stayed in Florence, Switzerland, Austria, the Netherlands and Spain. He also went to England to study Turner.

He taught in Strasbourg until the War in 1939. In 1945 he returned and taught at the Lycée Kléber.
In 1975, at the age of 74, he went travelling in Norway and the Nordic countries.

Personal life
In 1932 he married Madeleine Simon. They had a daughter, Elisabeth.
After a short illness, Robert Kuven died 23 April 1983. He is buried in the West Cemetery in Strasbourg.
The catholic priest Carl Küven (until 1944 Strasbourg-Ostwald, later on Stuttgart) most probably was his brother.

Honours
The Square Robert Kuven in Strasbourg is named in his honour.

Works

Book illustrations

Watercolours
Betschdorf
Jardins
La cour du cloître
La terrasse
La porte de Darstein
L'auberge du Kochersberg
Ostwald
Paysage de mine
Paysage des Vosges
Paysage et église
Paysage et maisons
Uttwiller
Niederaltdorf
Ottrot

Oils
Bouquet de fleurs
Jardin de l'Orangerie
Ferme alsacienne en pays de Hanau
Paysage
Paysage des Vosges
Portrait de femme

References

Bibliography
 François Joseph Fuchs, "Robert Kuven", in Nouveau Dictionnaire de biographie alsacienne, Vol. 22, p. 2161
Alsace collections with self-portrait and full early biography
DNA = Dernières Nouvelles D'alsace, 1 August 2010 with portrait

External links
Worldcat

1901 births
1983 deaths
20th-century German painters
20th-century German male artists
German male painters
Painters from Alsace